Reign of Terror: How the 9/11 Era Destabilized America and Produced Trump is a 2021 book by Spencer Ackerman. The book discusses how the September 11 attacks and subsequent Global War on Terror created the political environment in the United States that resulted in the election of Donald Trump in the 2016 United States presidential election.

References

American non-fiction books
2021 books
Viking Press books